is a Japanese anime director, and storyboard artist. He is best known for directing the majority of Detective Conan.

Works
Space Adventure Cobra: The Movie (1982 Film), Animation
Urusei Yatsura: Only You (1983 Film), Assistant Animator, In between Artist
Once Upon a Time [Windaria] (1986 Film), Key Animation
Project A-Ko 4: Final (1989 OVA), Animation
Mischievous Twins: The Tales of St. Clare's (1991 TV series), Episode Director
Detective Conan (1996 TV series), Director, Storyboard, Episode Director
Detective Conan: The Time Bombed Skyscraper (1997 Film), Key Animation, Sub-Character Design
Detective Conan: The Fourteenth Target (1998 Film), Key Animation
Detective Conan: The Last Magician of the Century (1999 Film), Director
Hamtaro (2000 TV series), Storyboard
Detective Conan: Conan vs Kid vs Yaiba (2001 OVA), Director, Storyboard
Detective Conan: 16 Suspects (2002 OVA), Director, Storyboard
Detective Conan: Conan and Heiji and the Vanished Boy (2003 OVA), Director, Storyboard
Detective Conan: Magician of the Silver Sky (2004 Film), Director
Detective Conan: Strategy Above the Depths (2005 Film), Director, Storyboard
Kamichu! (2005 TV series), Storyboard (ep 12), Key Animation (ep 12)
Detective Conan: The Private Eyes' Requiem (2006 Film), Director
Detective Conan: A Challenge from Agasa (2007 OVA), Director, Storyboard
Detective Conan: Jolly Roger in the Deep Azure (2007 Film), Director, Storyboard
Itazura na Kiss (2008 TV series), Storyboard (ep 20)
Detective Conan: Full Score of Fear (2008 Film), Director, Storyboard
Detective Conan: The Raven Chaser (2009 Film), Director
The Lost Ship In The Sky (2010 Film), Director
Quarter of Silence (2011 Film), Director
The Eleventh Striker (2012 Film), Director
Private Eye in the Distant Sea (2013 Film)
Dimensional Sniper (2014 Film)
Sunflowers of Inferno (2015 Film)

External links

 Yasuichiro Yamamoto anime at Media Arts Database 

1961 births
Living people
Anime directors
Japanese film directors
People from Chigasaki, Kanagawa
Artists from Kanagawa Prefecture